Eto Na Ang Susunod Na Kabanata (English: This is the Next Chapter) is a TV show broadcast in the Philippines for five months in 2001. It was a political satire of the Philippine government; a situational comedy that depicts the lives of the common "tao" and their interactions with the "demi-gods" of politics. The show portrays the humorous state of Philippine affairs while making its audience aware of what is really happening to the country.

Cast and characters
 Noel Trinidad as Anding Tengco
 Tessie Tomas as Barbara Tengco
 Gabe Mercado as JP
 Joji Isla as Del
 Sammy Lagmay† as Sammy Lagmay
 Candy Pangilinan as Perlita Lagmay
 Nova Villa as Tita Delos Santos
 Roderick Paulate as Benny Dela Cruz
 Carmi Martin as Clara
 Alicia Mayer as Adeline
 Winnie Cordero as Liwanag Lagmay
 Nanette Inventor as Liwanag Kataruray
 Berting Labra†
 Denise Joaquin as Twinkle
 Serena Dalrymple as Duchess
 Raffy Rodriguez
 Jon Santos
 Michelle Estevez as Trina Delos Santos
 Jennifer Sevilla as Jenny
 Ogie Diaz
 Jon Santos as Koring Sancho
 Kara Cruz as Kimberly Tengco

External links

See also
 List of shows previously aired by ABS-CBN

References

ABS-CBN original programming
Philippine television sitcoms
2001 Philippine television series debuts
2001 Philippine television series endings
Filipino-language television shows
Philippine satire